Western Michigan Broncos basketball may refer to either of the basketball teams that represent Western Michigan University:
 Western Michigan Broncos men's basketball
 Western Michigan Broncos women's basketball